(Lucius Valerius) Messalla (fl. 3rd century) was a Roman senator.

Life
Messalla is assumed to be a member of the third century Patrician gens Valeria, possibly the son of Lucius Valerius Poplicola Balbinus Maximus. In 280 he was appointed consul prior alongside Vettius Gratus.

Christian Settipani has suggested that Valerius Maximus Basilius, praefectus urbi of Rome in 319, was his son.

Ancestry

References

Sources
 Martindale, J. R.; Jones, A. H. M, The Prosopography of the Later Roman Empire, Vol. I AD 260–395, Cambridge University Press (1971)
 Mennen, Inge, Power and Status in the Roman Empire, AD 193-284 (2011)

3rd-century Romans
Imperial Roman consuls
Valerii Messallae
Year of birth unknown
Year of death unknown